Austrheim is a village in Austrheim municipality in Vestland county, Norway. The village is located on the south-central part of the island of Fosnøyna, at the end of the Austrheimsvågen bay. Austrheim Church is located in this village. It is the only church in the municipality.

References

Villages in Vestland
Austrheim